Howard E. Hilstrom (born 18 March 1947) was a Canadian politician, rancher and police officer. Hilstrom served as a member of the House of Commons of Canada from 1997 to 2004. His career has included ranching and law enforcement.

He was elected in the Selkirk—Interlake electoral district under the Reform Party of Canada in the 1997 general election. He was re-elected in 2000 as the party changed names from the Canadian Alliance to the Conservative Party of Canada. He served in the 36th and 37th Canadian Parliaments. He served on parliamentary committees relating to agriculture during his terms of office.

Hilstrom left office in 2004 as he did not contest Selkirk—Interlake again. James Bezan, also of the Conservative Party, succeeded Hilstrom in the House of Commons.

External links
 

1947 births
Canadian Alliance MPs
Conservative Party of Canada MPs
Living people
Members of the House of Commons of Canada from Manitoba
People from Estevan
Reform Party of Canada MPs
Canadian people of Swedish descent
21st-century Canadian politicians